Medical Investigation is an American medical drama television series that began September 9, 2004, on NBC. It ran for 20 one-hour episodes before its cancellation on March 25, 2005. The series was co-produced by Paramount Network Television and NBC Universal Television Studio.

The series featured the cases of an elite team of medical experts of the National Institutes of Health (NIH) who investigate unusual public health crises, such as sudden outbreaks of serious  and mysterious diseases. In actuality, medical investigative duties in the United States are normally the responsibility of the Centers for Disease Control and Prevention (CDC) and local health departments, while the NIH is primarily a disease-research and -theory organization.

Cast
 Neal McDonough plays Dr. Stephen Connor; the leader of the team whose medical career has separated him from his family. Connor was previously a captain in the US Army, and fought in the Gulf War.
 Kelli Williams plays Dr. Natalie Durant; an expert in pathology and epidemiology, who often questions Connor, although serving as the team's second-in-command.
 Christopher Gorham plays Dr. Miles McCabe; the newest and youngest member of the team; frequently tries to prove his worth.
 Anna Belknap plays Eva Rossi; the team's media liaison who prevents the team's investigations from causing public panic.
 Troy Winbush plays Frank Powell; a highly skilled medical investigator who has been friends with Connor for sometime. Previously served in the US Navy.

Episodes

Rebroadcasts
The USA Network began running reruns on January 6, 2005, in what is called a "repurposed" broadcast. It is, however, no different from the original broadcasts. High definition reruns of the show are being broadcast on the Universal HD channel. In January 2007 the series began airing on NBC Universal's mystery and crime-themed cable channel, Sleuth.

References

External links
 
 

2000s American medical television series
NBC original programming
2000s American drama television series
2004 American television series debuts
2005 American television series endings
Television series by CBS Studios
Television series by Universal Television